Saskatoon John G. Diefenbaker International Airport  is an international airport located  north-west of downtown Saskatoon, Saskatchewan. The airport is served by passenger, courier and air freight operators. It is named for John Diefenbaker, the 13th Prime Minister of Canada.

The airport has nine passenger bridges, three ground loading positions, 32 check-in points, and a customs/immigration arrivals area.

The airport is classified as an airport of entry by Nav Canada and is staffed by the Canada Border Services Agency (CBSA). CBSA officers at this airport can handle aircraft with no more than 200 passengers. However, they can handle up to 300 if the aircraft is unloaded in stages.

In 2019, the airport saw a total of 1.49 million passengers pass through, a decrease of 1.9% over the previous year.

History 

On June 1, 1929, the city of Saskatoon was given a "Licence For Air Harbour" and the airport was established. This provided a home for the Saskatoon Aero Club.

From 1940 to 1947, the city leased the airport to the Royal Canadian Air Force (RCAF). The airport became RCAF Station Saskatoon. The station was a part of the British Commonwealth Air Training Plan, and the station was home to No. 4 Service Flight Training School. To support these operations four large hangars were built as well as support buildings including a hospital and control tower.

After the war (1947) the airport was transferred to the Canadian Department of Transport for civilian use. That year Trans-Canada Air Lines, now known as Air Canada, started providing passenger service using DC-3 aircraft. 

Air Canada in 1950 began operating the Canadair North Star at the airport, followed by the Vickers Viscount in 1955. A new terminal building was also constructed in 1955 by Transport Department architects.

From 1950 to 1978 the Airport was again made a station of the RCAF. The station was named RCAF Station Saskatoon.

On January 1, 1971, the City of Saskatoon annexed the airport and surrounding lands totalling 2,111.7 acres. The nearby area containing personnel housing and support services was annexed by the city in 1965.

Due to larger aircraft and more frequent flights, in 1972 plans were drafted for a new terminal building. The new terminal built by Holiday and Scott was completed and opened on November 29, 1975. The former terminal was renovated in 1977. From 1977 to 1984 Boeing 747 charter flights were operated by Wardair to Europe until Wardair was bought by Canadian Airlines International.

In 1993 the name of the airport was changed to recognize Canada's 13th Prime Minister John Diefenbaker. In 1995 under the Canada-US Open Skies agreement Northwest Airlines started service to Minneapolis – Saint Paul. In 1996 WestJet began Boeing 737 service. In 1999 the airport was turned over to the Saskatoon Airport Authority (now known as Skyxe), as part of the National Airports Policy.

In 2000, Nav Canada constructed a new control tower and the airport authority began renovations and expansions to the terminal building. In October 2002 the first two phases of renovations to the air terminal building was completed at a cost of $18 million. The updated terminal facilities are designed to handle 1.4 million passengers annually was designed by Kindrachuk Agrey Architects. In 2005 additional renovations were completed to the check-in area and baggage screening as well as the addition of a fifth bridge. In 2006 the airport also expanded public parking to 500 stalls. In March 2008 work started on the rehabilitation of runway 09/27, taxiway Foxtrot and Alpha at a cost of $16 million.

Between October 2005 and May 2008, Air Canada ended "mainline" service into Saskatoon, turning over routes to Air Canada Jazz. In 2006, Pronto Airways started operating at the airport. In 2006 Transwest Air introduced service to Fort McMurray, Alberta. For a short period of time between 2006 and April 2007 Northwestern Air also operated flights to Fort McMurray. In 2008, United Airlines began non-stop regional service from Denver that operated until 2015. In 2009, United Airlines announced regional service from Chicago that operated until 2014.

In March 2015, Missinippi Airways began thrice-weekly service to Saskatoon direct to Flin Flon, Manitoba, with a one-stop connection to The Pas, Manitoba. Missinippi Airways ceased flying out of Saskatoon three months later. In June, 2016, New Leaf Airlines announced they would begin flying to Kelowna and Hamilton direct from Saskatoon twice weekly beginning July 27, 2016. New Leaf cancelled service to Saskatoon in November 2016.

Expansion 2010s 
In 2009, Skyxe announced a new expansion for the terminal. The plan included nine bridgeable gates and a food court, including a full-service restaurant and bar (post-security). Also included in the plan was more retail, including a duty-free outlet, and another food court before the security area. The new design moved security for more room for retail, but also planned to double the size of the security area. The check-in area was not included in the expansion. A new Canadian Customs and Immigration area was put in, as well as two more baggage carousels. The designers also left space that was meant for an American Pre-Customs and Immigration area, so in the future YXE can be upgraded to have U.S. Pre-Clearance area.

In 2010 construction started on apron improvements, remote stands and preparatory work to start on reconstruction of the terminal building in 2011. The expansion was designed to accommodate eight bridges, expanded passenger waiting areas, a business/first class lounge and expanded baggage claim area. Phase 1 of Saskatoon International Airport expansion began in 2012. The expansion virtually doubled the size of the air terminal building to 266,670 ft2. In 2013, Skyxe completed its phase 1 terminal expansion. In October, the airport welcomed its first arriving and departing passengers into the expanded terminal. In April 2015, construction of the terminal was completed at overall cost of the project was $53 million.

In February 2016, Skyxe issued request for proposals for Air Terminal Building Groundside Departures Hall Expansion, West Aero Park Development, and Saskatoon International Airport rebranding. Skyxe issued additional request for proposals for Shuttle Parking Lot Development and Apron III and V Pavement Rehabilitation.

Passenger services 

The airport contains a small historical display on the main floor. There are also numerous art/photography displays by local artists around the terminal. There are a full restaurant, a Tim Hortons and a Starbucks in the post-security area, and a Relay store near the entrances.

In February 2015, St. John's Ambulance introduced therapy dogs to the airport, providing a service to put nervous passengers at ease.

Ground transportation 
Saskatoon Transit (Route 11) provides city bus service between the airport and the downtown core.

Taxi service several car rental agencies are available from the airport.

Other air side services 
The airport has a variety of additional buildings. These include the International Aviation Terminal (used by Air Canada Cargo, Anderson Aviation, Dryden Air-services). Twenty-three former Air Canada Jazz and Canadian Regional Airlines Fokker F28 aircraft have been stored at the airport since they were retired from the fleet in 2003.

The Saskatchewan Air Ambulance provides fixed wing air ambulance services, and has its headquarters and main base at the airport. There is a hangar for a Shock Trauma Air Rescue Society helicopter out of the Saskatoon airport.

Airlines and destinations

Passenger

Cargo

Statistics

Annual traffic

Facilities 
Saskatoon John G. Diefenbaker Regional Airport Fire Department operates two crash tenders (Oshkosh Striker 3000) in a renovated (2008) fire station to provide fire and rescue services at the airport.

Garda Security is contracted by the Canadian Air Transport Security Authority to provide security screening for passengers, non-passengers, and baggage screening. All Screening Officers wear CATSA uniforms. However, they are not Government of Canada employees, but rather are employed by the contractor.

Accidents and incidents 
On April 1, 2011, a Fugro Aviation Canada Limited CASA C-212, C-FDKM, carrying three crew, crashed while attempting a landing at Saskatoon Airport. After declaring an emergency with an engine failure, the aircraft crashed on a Saskatoon street (Wanuskewin Drive) and hit a concrete sound barrier. One person was killed, and two were injured.

See also 
 Saskatoon/Banga International Air Aerodrome
 List of airports in Saskatchewan

References

External links 

 Saskatoon/John G. Diefenbaker International Airport Homepage

 
 Video from Plane landing in Saskatoon

Certified airports in Saskatchewan
Transport in Saskatoon
Airports of the British Commonwealth Air Training Plan
John Diefenbaker
National Airports System